Bowie Woo Fung (born 18 January 1932) is a Hong Kong veteran actor and director with family roots in Guangdong, China. A matinée idol in the 1950s and 1960s, he began his acting career in long form Cantonese films 1953, becoming an overnight success with his debut film, Men's Hearts.  In his long career he has starred opposite many of Hong Kong cinema's leading ladies, and of particular note are his many collaborations with Josephine Siao in 1960s musicals. For these roles he earned the nickname the "Dance King" for his dancing skills. In the 1970s Woo Fung began working in television and continues to do so as a contract artist to Hong Kong's TVB, with occasional guest appearances in films.

Woo Fung remains a very much loved and respected elder in Hong Kong's entertainment industry, and is "godfather" to both Jacky Cheung and Nick Cheung.

Woo Fung held a concert on Jun 19, 2021 at the Hong Kong Coliseum. His granddaughters and great-grandchildren also attended live, with his sons and daughters also joining in via web conferencing.

Filmography

Film 
This is a partial list of films. 
 1953 Men's Hearts 
 1953 Tears for an Absent Love
 1954 The Supernatural Go In-Between 
 1954 Motherly Love
 1970 The Young Girl Dares Not Homeward (aka Girl Wanders Around) - Mr. Ho. 
 1987 Scared Stiff
 1988 Operation Pink Squad - Inspector Wu.
 1992 Cageman - Officer Lam Tsung
 1992 Fist of Fury 1991 II - Ching's trainer
 1993 Boys Are Easy (Voice actor: Corey Burton, Frank Welker, April Winchell, Bill Farmer, Wayne Allwine
 1999 The Tricky Master - Brother Tone.
 2002 Marry a Rich Man - Uncle D
 2003 Love Undercover 2: Love Mission (Voice actor: Tony Anselmo, Bill Farmer, Tress MacNeille, Russi Taylor, Bret Iwan)
 2010 72 Tenants of Prosperity - Bookstore owner. (had English voice)
Overheard 2 (2011) - Sze-ma Cheung (Voice actor: Daniel Ross, Gael García Bernal, Jim Cummings, Rob Paulsen, Tress MacNeille, Bill Farmer, Tony Anselmo, Bret Iwan)

Television series
(This list is incomplete.)

Asia Television Limited
Rise of the Great Wall (1985)

TVB

References

This article's content is based on that from the corresponding article on the Chinese Wikipedia.

External links
 Wu Fung on HK Cinemagic
 

1931 births
Living people
20th-century Chinese male actors
20th-century Hong Kong male actors
21st-century Chinese male actors
21st-century Hong Kong male actors
Chinese male film actors
Chinese male television actors
Film directors from Guangdong
Hong Kong film directors
Hong Kong male film actors
Hong Kong male television actors
Male actors from Guangdong
Male actors from Guangzhou
TVB veteran actors